This is a list of the operas performed by Glyndebourne Festival Opera during the music directorship (1952-1963) of Vittorio Gui.  Operas performed by Glyndebourne forces at venues other than Glyndebourne are also included.

Sources

See also 
 Glyndebourne Festival Opera: history and repertoire, 1934–1951

References

Glyndebourne Festival Opera
Opera-related lists
1952 music festivals
British music-related lists
1950s in British music
1960s in British music